English music may refer to:

 Folk music of England
 Music of the United Kingdom
 English Music (novel), 1992 novel by Peter Ackroyd